Paroo Station, often referred to as Paroo, is a pastoral lease that operates as a cattle station.

The Meekatharra–Wiluna railway used to traverse the property.

Frederick Albert Crews along with his son C. V. Crews and Reginald Grant acquired Paroo in 1923 and set about stocking the property with sheep.
Crews and Grant put Paroo up for auction in 1927 after they dissolved their partnership. Stock were watered by 14 wells, most which were equipped with mills and troughs.
The Crews family retained Paroo and appointed J. C. Baker as station manager.

In 1934 the property was put back on the market after Clarrie Crews fell to ill health. The property boundary was almost completed fenced, falling  short of finishing the boundary fence. The property had 21 wells and was stocked with 8,000 sheep.

In 1950 the station produced 115 bales of wool from a flock of 4,500 sheep.

See also
List of ranches and stations

References

Mid West (Western Australia)
Pastoral leases in Western Australia
Stations (Australian agriculture)